On Probation is a 1983 animated short film created by Aardman Animations. It is one of five films released as part of the Conversation Pieces series.

References

1981 animated films
1981 films
1980s animated short films
Aardman Animations short films
British animated short films
Films directed by Peter Lord
1980s English-language films
1980s British films